The 1965–66 Chicago Black Hawks season was the Hawks' 40th season in the NHL, and the club was coming off a third-place finish in 1964–65, as Chicago had a record of 34–28–8, earning 76 points, which was their lowest point total since 1961–62.  The Hawks then upset the first place Detroit Red Wings in the NHL semi-finals, before losing to the Montreal Canadiens in seven games in the 1965 Stanley Cup Finals.

Chicago began the season very strong, going unbeaten in their first seven games, with a 6–0–1 record, before recording their first loss of the year.  The Hawks continued to play very strong hockey all season long, only once did they have a losing streak of more than three games, as the club set a team record for wins with 37, and their 82 points earned was a six-point improvement over the previous season, as the Black Hawks finished second in the NHL, and earned a playoff spot for the eighth consecutive season.

On February 26, 1966, team owner James D. Norris died due to a heart attack.  Norris was 59 years old.

Offensively, the Hawks were led by Bobby Hull, who had a record breaking season, as he scored an NHL record 54 goals, while earning an NHL record 97 points, as he won the Art Ross Trophy and Hart Memorial Trophy for his efforts.  Stan Mikita recorded a team high 48 assists and finished second with 78 points in NHL scoring.  Phil Esposito had a strong season, scoring 27 goals and 53 points, while Bill Hay had 20 goals and 51 points.  Kenny Wharram and Doug Mohns each scored over 20 goals, earning 26 and 22 respectively.  On the blueline, Pierre Pilote led the way, earning 36 points, while fellow defenseman Pat Stapleton earned 34 points.  Matt Ravlich led the club with 78 penalty minutes.

In goal, Glenn Hall earned the majority of playing time, tying the club record with 34 victories, while posting a team best 2.63 GAA, along with 4 shutouts.

The Hawks would face the Detroit Red Wings in the NHL semi-finals for the fourth consecutive season, as the Wings finished fourth in the NHL standings with a record of 31–27–12, recording 74 points, which was eight fewer than the Black Hawks.  The series opened with two games at Chicago Stadium, and the Black Hawks took a 1–0 series lead, as they defeated Detroit 2–1, however, the Red Wings evened the series up, as Detroit stunned Chicago with a 7–0 win in the second game.  The series shifted to the Detroit Olympia for the next two games, however, in the third game, the Hawks took the series lead, with a 2–1 victory, but once again, the Red Wings evened the series, easily defeating Chicago 5–1 to tie the series up at two.  The fifth game was played in Chicago, but it was Detroit winning the game 5–3, and taking the series lead, and the underdog Red Wings completed the upset in the sixth game held back in Detroit, as they defeated the Black Hawks 3–2 to end the series.

Season standings

Record vs. opponents

Game log

Regular season

Detroit Red Wings 4, Chicago Black Hawks 2

Season stats

Scoring leaders

Goaltending

Playoff stats

Scoring leaders

Goaltending

Draft picks
Chicago's draft picks at the 1965 NHL Amateur Draft held at the Queen Elizabeth Hotel in Montreal, Quebec.

References

Sources
Hockey-Reference
Rauzulu's Street
Goalies Archive
HockeyDB
National Hockey League Guide & Record Book 2007

Chicago Blackhawks seasons
Chicago
Chicago